St Mellons is a district and suburb of eastern Cardiff, the capital city of Wales. Prior to 1996 St Mellons was the name given to the community largely north of Newport Road (B4487) which included the old St Mellons village. After 1996 the old community was divided and renamed as Old St Mellons and Pontprennau, with the newer, much larger area of modern housing and business parks to the south of Newport Road retaining the St Mellons name. Historically in Monmouthshire, St Mellons became part of South Glamorgan and Cardiff in 1974.

History
St Mellons village began as a small commercial centre in the historic county of Monmouthshire, relying heavily on rural agriculture, farming and travel. Owners of coach houses or coaching inns would cater for travellers using Newport Road, the old Roman Road between Cardiff and London.

St Mellons became a community (the lowest tier of local government) and part of the city of Cardiff district of South Glamorgan under the Local Government Act 1972 on 1 April 1974. The St Mellons community was divided and renamed in 1996: Old St Mellons was created from the eastern part (largely the Old St Mellons ward). The remaining part of the St Mellons community became Pontprennau.

When people refer to St Mellons today, they are often not talking about the historic St Mellons, but the considerably larger and more modern housing estate which has been built to the south and east. The newer estate has retained the name 'St Mellons'. Many buildings in Old St Mellons date back to the 19th century while the vast majority of buildings in St Mellons were built in the late 20th and early 21st centuries.

Vaendre Hall off Vaendre Close was built in 1850 for the industrialist John Cory, it sits on a 4 acre estate, having been sold with 18 acres in 1893. It is bordered by St Mellons golf course.

Origins of the name
The English name St Mellons is believed to be derived from the 6th-century Saint Melaine who became Bishop of Rennes in Brittany, rather than the more legendary 4th-century Mellonius, Bishop of Rouen. One of these bishops is known to have been born and brought up in the area where the estate now exists, though stories of the two have become hopelessly confused in many biographies over the years leaving historians unsure as to which is which.

The Welsh translation of St Mellons is Llaneirwg which is made up of Llan, a Welsh word meaning 'enclosure'. Wales was originally evangelised by Celtic monks whose practice was to move into an area, and erect small premises within a fenced area - 'the enclosure'. From here they continued their work and subsequently a church would be erected on the site. The extent of the missionary activity in Wales is shown by the number of place names beginning with 'Llan' which is generally followed by the name of the missionary monk who founded the church in that place. In the case of LLaneirwg,'Eurwg' is the name of a mythical King of Gwent. Eurwg is said to have lived on the hill at St Mellons during the Romano-British era, he and his people were converted to Christianity and baptised in the nearby Rhymney River. Eurwg's church was erected near the site of the former church of 1360 and the area has since been known as Llaneirwg, literally "Church of Eirwg/Eurwg".

Governance
The modern St Mellons is included in the Trowbridge community and electoral ward which currently has three seats on Cardiff Council.

St Mellons (or Trowbridge) does not have a community council and the area falls outside the boundaries of Old St Mellons Community Council.

The area
The modern St Mellons is included in the Trowbridge community and electoral ward (Old St Mellons combines with neighbouring Pontprennau to become a Pontprennau & Old St Mellons ward). The 2001 Census put the population of Trowbridge as 14,801, the 4th most populated ward in Cardiff. Located on the eastern edge of Cardiff, St Mellons is bordered by the unitary authority of Newport.

Facilities

The area is home to two major retail complexes. The largest features a Tesco petrol station and superstore, which hit the headlines in January 2010 when it banned customers from shopping in their nightwear, The Willows (SA Brains public house) and a parade of small retail units including a hairdresser, solicitor,  betting shop, dentist, fish & chip takeaway and newsagent. Plans for a massive overhaul of the site were approved in March 2009. The plans include demolition of the existing 5,000sq M store and six smaller units, to be replaced by a brand new 11,000sq M store built over a ground floor car park, however due to the economic downturn of recent years, these plans have now been axed.

The other complex, located approximately one mile away, has Shamrat (an Indian Restaurant), a Boots Chemist, doctor's surgery and two previously empty supermarket units which once belonged to Hyper Value and Kwik Save until both companies went into liquidation in 2006 and 2007. These have now been occupied by a What! store. Further to the east, near the A48(M) Junction, there is the 3 star St Mellons Hotel and Spa, the St Mellons Golf Club, The Heron Marsh (no longer called The Heron Marsh) public house, and the Blue Diamond Garden centre complex.

There are a number of sports and leisure facilities dotted around the district, including floodlit outdoor courts, playing fields and children's play parks (at least two children's play areas had the equipment removed and nature took over)as well as community centres (now demolished), a bowls club (now demolished), job centre and St Mellons Library. There is also Hendre Lake Park; a park and man-made lake popular with local fishermen situated near the mainline railway.

The Beacon Centre

Toward the south of the estate there is the Beacon Centre which is a community centre created in the early 2000s. The centre runs a large variety of groups and events for the community. The centre is home to the Beacon Church, an Elim Pentecostal church.

Shops and public houses

In Old St Mellons there is a Texaco petrol station, newsagent and convenience store, fish & chip shop, and hairdresser. The Post Office closed in 2009. There are also four public houses situated in close proximity along Newport Road: The Bluebell Inn, The Star Inn, The Coach House and The Fox and Hounds (widely believed to be one of the oldest pubs in Cardiff). These establishments were able to gain extra business on weekends by exploiting the Sunday Closing (Wales) Act 1881. The act prohibited the sale of alcohol in Welsh establishments on the Sabbath, but St Mellons was in the ancient county of Monmouthshire where the act did not take effect until 1921.

Public houses in Old St Mellons

Education
St Mellons has 5 state primary schools: Meadowlane Primary School, St Bishop Childs Church in Wales, Oakfield Primary, Willowbrook Primary and St. Mellons Primary. It also has a private school St John's College, Cardiff, amongst the best performing schools in Wales, based on results. The building and surrounding fields were part of the Ty-to-Maen convalescent house, which only closed in the 1970s. The surrounding land was sold off for housing in the late 1990s following the death of the house's former owner William Nicholls, who now has a street on the estate named after him.

There are no learning institutions in this suburb for secondary, tertiary or higher education students (other than for fee-payers at St John's College). Two secondary schools in the Rumney /Llanrumney area nearby, Eastern High  www.easternhigh.cardiff.sch.uk and St Illtyd's High School  (St. Illtyd's also admits non-Catholics) mop up most secondary school pupils, who are expected to travel by bus or car to these establishments from St Mellons (at their own expense). Proposals in former years for a secondary school in the Tesco/ Cath Cobb Woods area have been abandoned and strategically forgotten about.

Tertiary education is handled nearby at the Cardiff and Vale College, Rumney or St David's Catholic College, Cyncoed (which also admits non-Catholics).

Business park

The St Mellons Business Park is a collection of large scale business parks located on low-lying land east of St Mellons considered to be Cardiff's green belt. It has a vast number of factories and office units which have been (or are still) occupied by such companies as Capita, Gilesports, TBI, and Lloyds TSB. A number of roads in and around the business parks are named after computer programming languages, namely Pascal, COBOL and Fortran.

Conservation area
Old St Mellons has been deemed an area of special architectural or historical interest and lies in a conservation area which Cardiff County Council first adopted in 1977. The area was reassessed and updated in July 2007 to cover a smaller land area. A number of Grade II listed buildings lie inside the boundary of the conservation area including the Bluebell and Coach House (previously named White Hart) public houses, St Johns College, and the two churches. The Fox and Hounds public house, though widely considered an important landmark, is only covered by a local listing.

Coastal defences
Much of the newer estates were built on the Wentloog Levels, areas of low-lying farmland which regularly became flooded until they were reclaimed from the sea during Roman times. A system of drainage reens and sluice gates together with a seawall which runs from the River Usk in the east to the Rhymney River in the west protect the area from the risk of coastal flooding as the land is still only a few metres above sea level.

Wildlife
Despite large scale development, a lot of wildlife can still be seen especially to the eastern fringe: foxes, rabbits, grey squirrels, buzzards, herons, egrets,  moorhens, swans, mallards, green woodpeckers and many other birds are a common sight.

Cardiff (Blooms) Garden Centre
Cardiff (Blooms) Garden Centre (10 January 2011) (With Staff In Beechwood College In Sully)

Hendre Lakes Development

Hendre Lakes Business Park is a large commercial property scheme proposed on land to the east of St Mellons by Cardiff Parkway Developments. Other investors in the project include Investec and the Welsh Government, which has a 10% equity stake.

The offices and other proposed facilities would be served by a new Cardiff Parkway train station as well as park and ride facilities.

Subject to planning, work on both projects is expected to start with the station and a first phase of 300,000 sq ft of 900,000 sq ft of development at Cardiff Hendre Lakes, completed in 2023.

Transport

Roads
Main roads have a 30 mph speed limit, except for a section of Newport Road which is 40 mph. There are no permanent speed cameras and very few speed bumps, pedestrian crossings or traffic lights. A number of road-related deaths in recent years has led to residents campaigning that these traffic calming measures be implemented before more lives are lost. In late 2008, Cardiff Council began implementing new traffic calming measures outside the primary schools, including zebra crossings and speed bumps.

The area is located next to Junction 29a of the A48 (M)/Eastern Avenue Junction, where the A48 continues eastbound through Coedkernew and the A48(M) rejoins the M4.

Proposed M4 relief road
Plans are in place to utilise the area's motorway links by creating a new dual carriageway. The St Mellons / Wentloog Link road would become part of the Cardiff Ring Road, crossing the railway line to serve the existing freight terminal and industrial land built on the Wentloog Levels.

The plans, however, are not without objection from local residents who fear their health, safety and the value of their homes will all be affected. The road is set to be built in low-lying marsh land, which is a designated Site of Special Scientific Interest (SSSI).

Buses
Cardiff Bus services 30, 44 and 45 serve the area. Services run frequently between the area and Cardiff City Centre.

Rail
There is no local railway station, despite Hendre Lake park being adjacent to the Freight Terminal Port, situated along the main line between Cardiff and Newport. The nearest main line station is Cardiff Central.

In July 2017, Transport Secretary Chris Grayling gave his backing to a privately financed £25 million station at St Mellons, to be known as Cardiff Parkway and opening by February 2020.

See also
Cefn Mably

References

External links
A Community website for New St Mellons
www.geograph.co.uk : photos of St Mellons and surrounding area

Districts of Cardiff
History of Monmouthshire
Former communities of Wales